Carex longicuspis is a tussock-forming species of perennial sedge in the family Cyperaceae. It is native to parts of Tibet.

See also
List of Carex species

References

longicuspis
Taxa named by Johann Otto Boeckeler
Plants described in 1888
Flora of Tibet